Sampelga is a department or commune of Séno Province in northern Burkina Faso. Its capital lies at the town of Sampelga.

Towns and villages

References

Departments of Burkina Faso
Séno Province